Nazgol Ansarinia (born 1979) is an Iranian interdisciplinary visual artist.

Biography 
Ansarina was born in 1979 in Tehran, Pahlavi Iran. She holds a BA degree from the London College of Communication, and a MFA degree from the California College of the Arts. In March 2009, she was awarded the Abraaj Capital Art Prize. 

Her work is included in the collections of the Queensland Art Gallery, the Los Angeles County Museum of Art, the Tate Gallery and the British Museum.

See also 

 List of Iranian women artists

References

External links 
 Join the Curator: A Conversation with Artist Nazgol Ansarinia from the Smithsonian’s National Museum of Asian Art
 images of Ansarina's work on the Contemporary Art Library

1979 births
Living people
20th-century Iranian women artists
21st-century Iranian women artists